Bagwal Bandi is a village of Abbottabad District in Khyber Pakhtunkhwa province of Pakistan. It is located at 34°8'10N 73°6'25E with an altitude of 954 metres (3133 feet). Neighbouring settlements include Baghdara, Shadial and Patian.

References

Populated places in Abbottabad District